Scott Morgan is a former Welsh international rugby union player. His usual position was Lock or Flanker.

Morgan began his career at Neath before joining Llanelli, Bristol and Leeds. In 2006 he joined Cardiff Blues. During his time at Leeds he helped them win the 2004–05 Powergen Cup, the final of which he started.

In July 2010 Morgan joined Newport Gwent Dragons. He was released by Newport Gwent Dragons in June 2012

From the start of the 2013–2014 season, Morgan became Head Coach of Coventry RFC in National League 1, the third tier of the English rugby union system.

International

Morgan represented Wales at under-21 level and was a part of the Welsh squad for the 2007 Six Nations championship. He made his debut for the Wales national rugby union team in 2007 against Australia in Brisbane.

Honours
Powergen Cup/Anglo-Welsh Cup titles: 1
2005

References

External links
Cardiff Blues profile
Newport Gwent Dragons profile
Wales profile

Rugby union players from Neath
Welsh rugby union players
Cardiff Rugby players
Leeds Tykes players
Dragons RFC players
Wales international rugby union players
Living people
1978 births
Rugby union locks
Rugby union flankers